Overhaulin is an American automotive reality television series. The show originally ran for five seasons between 2004 and 2008 on TLC. After a four-year hiatus, sixth season premiered on October 2, 2012 on Velocity and Discovery (Cablevision). In June 2019, it was announced that the show would be returning for a new season on November 16, 2019 on Motor Trend.

Hosts
The show's hosts were automobile designer Chip Foose and co-host Chris Jacobs; the creator and producer was Bud Brutsman. Courtney Hansen was the co-host of the show until 2005, when she left the show to pursue other interests.  She was replaced by Executive Producer Brutsman's wife Adrienne Janic ("AJ"). From Season 6 on, Jessi Combs, one of the early A-Team mechanics, returned and co-hosted as well as participated in the overhauls. Recently, Arianny Celeste had replaced Combs as Combs had moved on to another Velocity show, All Girls Garage. For two episodes of the eighth season and all of the truncated ninth season, Janic rejoined the show to co-host, and returned with Jacobs and Foose when the show was revived in 2019.

Concept
The show's premise was that an unknowing "victim" – the mark, in the show's language — is nominated to be "Overhauled" by his or her family or friends, the insiders.  The mark's car, usually an old and tired antique car, was obtained through some ruse.  Some common examples included the car being "stolen" by Evans, Janic or Foose, a car being misplaced or lost at a mechanic's shop, or the car being towed away by "police."

An integral part of the show was when the two co-hosts play tricks on the unsuspecting mark, sometimes acting in roles of insurance adjusters or law enforcement agents, other times helping the insider, while Chip Foose and a team of mechanics – dubbed "The A-Team" – have a week to remake the car into a custom masterpiece.  Each show ended with the surprise reuniting of owner and newly made-over car.

Production
Each episode would take a significant amount of planning, starting with the producers reviewing the thousands of submissions from those wanting to have a friend's or family member's vehicle overhauled, selecting a deserving person, and setting everything in motion.  Most builds would take place in Southern California, and true to the show's premise, the team would have only eight days to complete the build.  Up to sixty people could be involved at any one time with the show.  According to Associate Producer Jim Holloway, the show would assemble a team of seven or eight "A-Team" volunteer builders about four to five days before taping would start. The builders, who were usually masters of their craft, "work[ed] together... [with] a sense of camaraderie amongst them." Sometimes builders would leave the build, causing Chip Foose to request help from a friend or cohort to help the team finish.  Holloway noted that "we couldn't do the show without the builders or our sponsors." The set would have the names and logos of various sponsors, many of whom often helped with the build.

Once the project was chosen and scheduled, the show's major sponsors would ship parts to the build facility in advance of the show, while other sponsors would maintain a small on-site inventory.  This would allow such items as air-filter housings, tire sizes, and so on to be test fit without having to wait for shipments.

According to Holloway, each completed vehicle is worth around $150,000, but "in reality, they're priceless... Chip's so busy that it's almost impossible to get a car from the Foose shop, no matter how much money you've got."  In an interview, Foose said that "for me, seeing the look on the owner's face is the most rewarding part of the show. It's almost overwhelming to see their response, and it's the whole reason I do it. We worked hard to make their dream come true."

CNN's Warrior One
In 2006, the show remodeled a 1993 Hummer H1 that CNN used to cover the war in Iraq.  Over a one-week period, the Overhaulin''' crew replaced the engine, raised the vehicle's body and air brushed images of correspondents and troops onto the Hummer. They also added a DVD player, four televisions and a state-of-the-art sound system. TLC unveiled the revamped Hummer, named "Warrior One," in front of a swarm of fans, media and CNN employees.  According to co-host Chris Jacobs, "we wanted to commemorate the journalists who risked their lives, and in some cases, gave their lives to tell the story of the war."

The vehicle was unveiled in CNN Center in Atlanta, and was sold in 2007 Barrett-Jackson Scottsdale auction for $1,000,000.00 in a Fisher House Foundation charity lot.

Velocity revival
Velocity by Discovery renewed the show to help fill its programming schedule. Season 6 premiered on October 2, 2012 and concluded June 2, 2013.<ref>{{cite web
|url=https://www.variety.com/article/VR1118052123?refCatId=14
|title='Overhaulin returns on Velocity
|date=March 30, 2012
|author=Levine, Stuart
|publisher=Variety
|access-date=17 April 2012
}}</ref>  The revived show was produced by WATV Productions, who also produced two other Chip Foose-hosted series for Velocity, American Icon: The Hot Rod and American Icon: The Muscle Car. On October 12, 2015, a series finale was announced that a ninth season would be its last, consisting of four episodes.

Overhaulin' SEMA Edition 2012
In this episode (Season 6, Episode 5), Chip Foose and his "A" Team customized a 2012 Chrysler 300 S with 5.7L HEMI V8 engine into Foose Velocity 300 in front of live 2012 SEMA Show audience. After the build, the project vehicle was given away in a lottery held during the event. An additional 300S replica was produced and given away at a later date.

Series Overview

Specials

Season 1

Season 2

Season 3

Season 4

Season 5

Season 6

Season 7

Season 8

Season 9

Season 10

References

External links
 Episode Guide at Discovery.com
 
 Overhaulin' episode guide on TVGuide.com
 Foose Design Official Website
 WATV Productions Official Website

TLC (TV network) original programming
Automotive television series
2004 American television series debuts
2008 American television series endings
2000s American reality television series
2012 American television series debuts
2015 American television series endings
2010s American reality television series
English-language television shows
Discovery Channel original programming